The Russian Federation competed at the 2016 Summer Olympics in Rio de Janeiro, Brazil, from 5 to 21 August 2016. This was Russia's sixth consecutive appearance at the Summer Olympics as an independent nation.

On 18 July 2016, an independent investigation commissioned by World Anti-Doping Agency concluded that it was shown "beyond a reasonable doubt" that the RUSADA, the Ministry of Sport, the Federal Security Service (FSB) and the Centre of Sports Preparation of the National Teams of Russia had "operated for the protection of doped Russian athletes" within a "state-directed failsafe system" using "the disappearing positive [test] methodology." According to the McLaren Report, the Disappearing Positive Methodology operated from "at least late 2011 to August 2015." It was used on 643 positive samples, a number that the authors consider "only a minimum" due to limited access to Russian records. Based on these findings the International Olympic Committee called for an emergency meeting to consider banning Russia from the Summer Olympics.

On 24 July, the IOC rejected WADA's recommendation to ban Russia from the Summer Olympics and announced that a decision would be made by each sport federation with each positive decision having to be approved by a CAS arbitrator. On 7 August 2016, the IOC cleared 278 athletes, while 111 were removed because of the scandal.

On 7 August 2016, the International Paralympic Committee announced that it had voted unanimously to ban the entire Russian Paralympic team from competing at the 2016 Summer Paralympics, in the wake of a larger scandal that exposed the participation of Russian Olympic and Paralympic athletes in a state-sponsored doping program.

On 8 December 2016, silver medalist Misha Aloyan was found to have committed an anti-doping rule violation after testing positive for Tuaminoheptane, a specified stimulant, prohibited in-competition under S6 on the WADA Prohibited List, during an in-competition doping control on 21 August 2016. The results obtained by the athlete at the Rio 2016 Olympic Games were disqualified.

On 9 December 2016, Canadian lawyer Richard McLaren published the second part of his independent report. The investigation claimed that from 2011 to 2015, more than 1,000 Russian competitors in various sports (including summer, winter, and Paralympic sports) were involved in a cover-up. Emails indicate that athletes who tested positive for banned substances included five blind powerlifters, who may have been given drugs without their knowledge, and a fifteen-year-old.

Medalists  

| width=78% align=left valign=top |

Silver medalist Misha Aloyan was found to have committed an anti-doping rule violation after testing positive for Tuaminoheptane, a specified stimulant, prohibited in-competition under S6 on the WADA Prohibited List, during an in-competition doping control on 21 August 2016. The results obtained by the athlete in the Rio 2016 Olympic Games were disqualified.
|  style="text-align:left; width:22%; vertical-align:top;"|

Russian doping scandal

Media attention began growing in December 2014 when German broadcaster ARD reported on state-sponsored doping in Russia, comparing it to doping in East Germany. In November 2015, the World Anti-Doping Agency (WADA) published a report and the International Association of Athletics Federations (IAAF) suspended Russia indefinitely from world track and field events. The United Kingdom Anti-Doping agency later assisted WADA with testing in Russia. In June 2016, they reported that they were unable to fully carry out their work and noted intimidation by armed Federal Security Service (FSB) agents. After a Russian former lab director made allegations about the 2014 Winter Olympics in Sochi, WADA commissioned an independent investigation led by Richard McLaren. McLaren's investigation found corroborating evidence, concluding in a report published in July 2016 that the Ministry of Sport and the FSB had operated a "state-directed failsafe system" using a "disappearing positive [test] methodology" (DPM) from "at least late 2011 to August 2015".

In response to these findings, WADA announced that RUSADA should be regarded as non-compliant with respect to the World Anti-Doping Code and recommended that Russia be banned from competing at the 2016 Summer Olympics. The International Olympic Commission (IOC) rejected the recommendation, stating that the IOC and each sport's international federation would make decisions on each athlete's individual basis. One day prior to the opening ceremony, 278 athletes were cleared to compete under the Russian flag, while 111 were removed because of doping. In contrast, the entire Kuwaiti team was banned from competing under their own flag (for a non-doping related matter).

Unlike the IOC, the International Paralympic Committee voted unanimously to ban the entire Russian team from the 2016 Summer Paralympics and suspended the Russian Paralympic Committee, having found evidence that the DPM was also in operation at the 2014 Winter Paralympics.

The IOC's decision on 24 July 2016 was widely criticized by both athletes and writers, as well as members of the Olympic Committee. WADA's president Craig Reedie said, "WADA is disappointed that the IOC did not heed WADA's Executive Committee recommendations that were based on the outcomes of the McLaren Investigation and would have ensured a straight-forward, strong and harmonized approach." On the IOC's decision to exclude Stepanova, WADA director general Olivier Niggli stated that his agency was "very concerned by the message that this sends whistleblowers for the future." A member of the IOC Athletes' Commission, Hayley Wickenheiser, wrote, "I ask myself if we were not dealing with Russia would this decision to ban a nation [have] been an easier one? I fear the answer is yes". Writing for Deutsche Welle in Germany, Olivia Gerstenberger said that the head of the IOC, Thomas Bach had "flunked" his first serious test, adding, "With this decision, the credibility of the organization is shattered once more, while that of state-sponsored doping actually receives a minor boost". Bild (Germany) described Bach as "Putin's poodle".

The positive evaluation of every eligible participant is to be confirmed by a CAS arbitrator, which is "independent from any sports organization involved in the Olympic Games Rio 2016". On 30 July 2016, the IOC specified that following each federation's positive evaluation and its arbitration approval, a three-person IOC panel would be making the final decision. Originally Russia submitted a list of 389 athletes for competition. On 7 August 2016, the IOC cleared 278 athletes, while 111 were removed because of the scandal.

Athletics
On 17 June 2016, the International Association of Athletics Federations (IAAF) announced that Russia will not be permitted to field competitors in athletics due to the November 2015 doping-related temporary suspension of the All-Russia Athletic Federation (ARAF) from the IAAF, due to state-sponsored doping. Only Russian athletes tested mainly outside of the country under stringent measures would be allowed to participate in the 2016 Olympics. On 21 June 2016, the International Olympic Committee upheld the decision of the IAAF and banned ARAF from competing at the Summer Olympics. One month later, the Court of Arbitration for Sport rejected separate ARAF and "68 Claimant Athletes" appeals of the IAAF decision.

On 24 July 2016, the IOC rejected the IAAF and the World Anti-Doping Agency recommendation that if allowed Russian athletes could only compete as "neutral" athletes under the Olympic flag. Out of the 68 ARAF submitted athletes, only Darya Klishina was allowed to compete.

Weightlifting
Russian weightlifters had qualified their reduced maximum of six men's and four women's quota places for the Rio Olympics based on their combined team standing by points at the 2014 and 2015 IWF World Championships.

On 22 June 2016, the International Weightlifting Federation (IWF) announced that Russia would lose two quota places in Weightlifting at the 2016 Summer Olympics because of doping violations. IWF then went on to state that if the testing of 'B' samples proved to confirm that any country had three or more violations in the 2008 and 2012 Olympic re-testing programme, then that country would be suspended from international weightlifting for a period of one year, and would thereby be excluded from taking part in the Rio Olympics, alongside the already suspended Bulgaria. IWF clarified that after re-testing 'A' samples from 2008 and 2012 that the three countries thereby scheduled for suspension were Kazakhstan, Russia and Belarus. Russia appealed the decision to the Court of Arbitration for Sport on 6 July 2016.

On 29 July 2016, the International Weightlifting Federation issued a statement, stating that "the integrity of the weightlifting sport has been seriously damaged on multiple times and levels by the Russians, therefore an appropriate sanction was applied in order to preserve the status of the sport." The IWF noted that four further retests from Russian medalists at the 2012 Games had come back positive, that two of the Russian team had been withdrawn for previous bans in accordance with the IOC decision of 24 July 2016, and that of the remaining six entries from Russia, four were implicated in the 'disappearing positive methodology' uncovered by the McLaren report into state-sanctioned doping. IWF expressed its 'extreme shock and disappointment' at the statistics, stated that the Russian weightlifting had brought the sport into disrepute, and then sanctioned Russian weightlifting with a complete ban from the Games; the second team to receive it after Bulgaria.  Following the decision, the Executive Board transferred to quota places that came available to Albania, Georgia and Macedonia (women) and to Belgium, Croatia, El Salvador, Mongolia and Serbia.
The ban was upheld by the ad hoc division of the Court of Arbitration for Sports.

Banned athletes 

| width=78% align=left valign=top |

Competitors

| width=78% align=left valign=top |
The following is the list of the numbers of competitors who competed at the Games. The final number of competing athletes was 282.

Note that 1 reserve player that competed in Handball due to an injury to another player, is not counted as an athlete.

Archery

Russian archers qualified for the women's events after having secured a top eight finish in the team recurve at the 2015 World Archery Championships in Copenhagen, Denmark. The archery team was named to the Olympic roster on 13 July 2016.

On 25 July 2016, World Archery Federation announced that, following the criteria set down for the entry of Russian athletes to the 2016 Summer Olympics, that the three archers competing for Russia had been deemed eligible. On 4 August 2016, the IOC cleared all of the archers to participate.

Athletics

Field events

Badminton

Russia has qualified four badminton players for each of the following events into the Olympic tournament. Vladimir Malkov and Natalia Perminova were selected among the top 34 individual shuttlers each in the men's and women's singles, while London 2012 Olympians Vladimir Ivanov and Ivan Sozonov secured the men's doubles spot by virtue of their top 16 finish in the Badminton World Federation World Rankings as of 5 May 2016. On 28 July 2016, BFW cleared all four athletes for competition.

Boxing

Russia has entered eleven boxers to compete in the following weight classes into the Olympic boxing tournament. Vladimir Nikitin and Adlan Abdurashidov were the only Russians finishing among the top two of their respective division in the World Series of Boxing, while three further boxers (Aloyan, Zamkovoy, and Chebotarev) did so in the AIBA Pro Boxing Series. Vasily Yegorov, Vitaly Dunaytsev, and Evgeny Tishchenko had claimed their Olympic spots at the 2015 World Championships.

Yaroslava Yakushina and Anastasia Belyakova were the only two Russian women to book their Olympic spots with a semifinal victory at the 2016 European Qualification Tournament in Samsun, Turkey, and with a quarterfinal victory at the Women's World Championships in Astana, Kazakhstan, respectively. Meanwhile, Petr Khamukov secured an additional place on the Russian roster with his quarterfinal triumph at the 2016 AIBA World Qualifying Tournament in Baku, Azerbaijan. All of the boxers were cleared for competition one day prior to the opening ceremony.  However, Tishchenko's final match and Nikitin's quarterfinal match became controversial, leading to the suspension of the referees in question, with many observers saying that Tishchenko’s and Nikitin’s opponents were robbed.  Nikitin was forced to withdraw from his semifinal bout against Shakur Stevenson due to cuts he sustained in his previous bouts; he received a bronze medal.

On 8 December 2016 Misha Aloyan was found to have committed an anti-doping rule violation after testing positive for Tuaminoheptane, a specified stimulant, prohibited in-competition under S6 on the WADA Prohibited List, during an in-competition doping control on 21 August 2016. The results obtained by the athlete in the Rio 2016 Olympic Games were disqualified.

Men

Women

Canoeing

Slalom
Russian canoeists have qualified a maximum of one boat in each of the following classes through the 2015 ICF Canoe Slalom World Championships. The slalom canoeing team, including four returning Olympians from London 2012, was selected to the Russian roster at the 2016 European Championships on 15 May 2016.

Sprint
Russian canoeists have qualified a total of ten boats in each of the following distances for the Games through the 2015 ICF Canoe Sprint World Championships. Meanwhile, one additional boat was awarded to the Russian squad in men's K-1 1000 m by virtue of a top two national finish at the 2016 European Qualification Regatta in Duisburg, Germany.
As a response to the "multiple positive cases" of doping by Belarus and Romania, two further spare boats were accepted by the Russian team to round out the roster size to ten.

A total of 14 sprint canoeists (11 men and 3 women) were named to the Russian roster for the Games on 15 July 2016, with Alexander Dyachenko and Yury Postrigay looking to defend their men's sprint kayak double title at the Rio regatta.

On 26 July 2016, the International Canoe Federation announced that five selected Russian sprint canoeists, namely Yelena Anyushina, Natalia Podolskaya, Alexander Dyachenko, Andrey Kraitor and Aleksey Korovashkov, had been implicated in the DPM benefiting from the state-sponsored doping program. As a result, the Russian entries in the men's C-1 200 m, men's C-2 1000 m, and men's K-2 200 m, along with the women's events (K-1 200 m, K-1 500 m, and K-2 500 m), were removed, with four of the quota places being provisionally re-allocated to the different NOCs – women's K-2 500 m to Austria, women's K-1 200 m to Germany, men's K-2 200 m to Sweden and men's C-1 200 m to Iran. Kraitor's decision was reconsidered and was allowed to compete a day before the opening of the Games.

Men

Women

Qualification Legend: FA = Qualify to final (medal); FB = Qualify to final B (non-medal)

Cycling

Road
Russian riders qualified for the following quota places in the men's and women's Olympic road race by virtue of their top 15 final national ranking in the 2015 UCI Europe Tour (for men) and top 22 in the 2016 UCI World Ranking (for women). The road cycling team, highlighted by two-time bronze medalist Olga Zabelinskaya from London 2012, was named to the Olympic roster on 26 June 2016.

On 26 July 2016, UCI announced that three cyclists with previous bans had been withdrawn by ROC, these including Ilnur Zakarin, Olga Zabelinskaya and track rider Sergei Shilov. A further three unnamed riders were implicated in the 'disappearing positive methodology' uncovered by Richard McLaren's report into state-sanctioned doping. On 5 August 2016, the date of the Opening Ceremony, Zabelinskaya's, Shilov's and Zakarin's bans were reversed and they were cleared to compete.

Track
Following the completion of the 2016 UCI Track Cycling World Championships, Russian riders have accumulated spots in the men's team pursuit and women's team sprint. As a result of their place in the women's team sprint, Russia has assured its right to enter two riders in the women's sprint and keirin. Although Russia failed to earn a place in the men's team sprint, they managed to secure a single berth in the men's keirin and two more in the men's sprint, by virtue of their final individual UCI Olympic rankings in those events.

On 26 July 2016, UCI announced that three cyclists with previous bans had been withdrawn by ROC, these including track rider Sergei Shilov. A further three unnamed riders were implicated in the 'disappearing positive methodology' uncovered by Richard McLaren's report into state-sanctioned doping. The UCI confirmed that the men's pursuit team from which Shilov was excluded would be allowed to replace him only from the existing pool of accepted athletes. The following day, two further track cyclists, Kirill Sveshnikov and Dmitri Sokolov were named as implicated in the methodology, and withdrawn, placing the Russian entry in the men's team pursuit in doubt.

Sprint

Team sprint

Keirin

Mountain biking
Russia has qualified one mountain biker for the women's Olympic cross-country race, as a result of her nation's ninth-place finish in the UCI Olympic Ranking List of 25 May 2016. Due to the lack of eligible NOCs for Oceania on the list, the unused berth was added to the Russian mountain biking team as the next highest-ranked nation, not yet qualified, in the men's cross-country race. Beijing 2008 bronze medalist Irina Kalentieva and rookie Anton Sintsov were named to Russia's mountain biking team for the Games on 3 July 2016.

BMX
Russian riders qualified for one men's and one women's quota place for BMX at the Olympics, as a result of the nation's seventh-place finish for women in the UCI Olympic Ranking List and top four for men in the UCI BMX Individual Ranking List of 31 May 2016. The BMX riders were named to the Olympic roster on 3 June 2016.

Diving 

Russian divers qualified for the following individual and synchronized team spots at the Olympics through the 2015 FINA World Championships and 2016 FINA World Cup series. The diving team, headlined by London 2012 springboard champion Ilya Zakharov, was named to the Olympic roster at the Russian Championships in Penza on 11 June 2016. In regard to the doping scandal, the FINA federation cleared all Russian divers for competition.

Men

Women

Equestrian

Russia has fielded a composite squad of three riders into the Olympic team eventing by virtue of the following results in the individual FEI Olympic rankings: a top finish from Central & Eastern Europe and Central Asia, and two top nine finishes from the combined overall Olympic rankings. Two dressage riders have been added to the squad into the Olympic equestrian competition by virtue of a top two finish from Central & Eastern Europe in the individual FEI Olympic rankings. In regard to doping, on 4 August 2016, the IOC cleared all of the riders to participate in the competition.

Dressage

Eventing

Fencing

Russian fencers have qualified a full squad each in the men's team foil, women's team épée, and women's team sabre by virtue of their top 4 national finish in the FIE Olympic Team Rankings, while the men's épée team has claimed the spot as the highest ranking team from Europe outside the world's top four.

Meanwhile, 2012 Olympic bronze medalist Nikolay Kovalev and three-time Olympian Aleksey Yakimenko (men's sabre), along with women's foil fencers Inna Deriglazova and Aida Shanaeva, had claimed their individual spots on the Russian team by finishing among the top 14 in the FIE Adjusted Official Rankings.

The fencing team was officially named to the Olympic roster on 17 June 2016. In regard to the doping scandal, the International Fencing Federation, cleared all Russian fencers for competition.

Men

Women

Golf 

Russia has entered one golfer into the Olympic tournament. Maria Verchenova (world no. 338) qualified directly among the top 60 eligible players for their respective individual events based on the IGF World Rankings as of 11 July 2016. On 4 August 2016, Verchenova was cleared to participate in the competition.

Gymnastics

Artistic
Russia fielded a full squad of five gymnasts in both the men's and women's artistic gymnastics events through a top eight finish each in the team all-around at the 2015 World Artistic Gymnastics Championships in Glasgow. The men's and women's gymnastics squads, led by London 2012 uneven bars champion Aliya Mustafina and bronze medalists Denis Ablyazin and Maria Paseka, were named to the Olympic roster at the Russian Cup in Penza on 3 July 2016. The International Federation of Gymnastics cleared all Russian gymnasts to compete.

Men
Team

Individual finals

Women
Team

Individual finals

Rhythmic 
Russia has qualified a squad of rhythmic gymnasts for the individual and group all-around by finishing in the top 15 (for individual) and top 10 (for group) at the 2015 World Championships in Stuttgart, Germany. The rhythmic gymnastics squad was named on 24 July 2016, following the IOC's decision against a total blanket ban on the Russian Olympic team.

Trampoline
Russia has qualified two gymnasts in the men's trampoline by virtue of a top eight finish at the 2015 World Championships in Odense, Denmark. Meanwhile, an additional Olympic berth had been awarded to the Russian female gymnast, who finished in the top six at the 2016 Olympic Test Event in Rio de Janeiro.

Handball

Summary

Women's tournament

Russia women's handball team qualified for the Olympics by virtue of a top two finish at the third meet of the Olympic Qualification Tournament in Astrakhan. Russia women's handball team qualified for the Olympics by virtue of a top two finish at the third meet of the Olympic Qualification Tournament in Astrakhan. On 28 July 2016 it was announced that the International Handball Federation (IHF) cleared the entire team to compete in Rio de Janeiro.

Team roster

Group play

Quarterfinal

Semifinal

Gold medal match

Judo

Russia has qualified a total of eleven judokas (seven men and four women) for each of the following weight classes at the Games by virtue of their top 22 national finish for men and top 14 for women in the International Judo Federation (IJF) World Ranking List of 30 May 2016. Seven members of the Russian judo team were named to the Olympic roster on 31 May, with four more rounding out the lineup under the federation selection based on IOC requirements on 26 June 2016.

On 4 August 2016, the entire team was cleared to participate in the Olympics.

Men

Women

Modern pentathlon

Russia has qualified a total of four modern pentathletes for the following events at the Games. Aleksander Lesun and Donata Rimšaitė had claimed one of three available Olympic quota places each in the men's and women's event at the 2015 World Championships in Berlin, Germany, while Egor Puchkarevskiy and Gulnaz Guybaidullina added a second spot each to the full roster through the European Championships. Maksim Kustov became the third Russian to qualify for the men's event in Rio, as a result of his world ranking as of 31 May 2016, leading to his selection to the Olympic team instead of Puchkarevskiy.

On 26 July 2016, Maksim Kustov was named as one of the athletes implicated in the 'disappearing positive methodology' as part of the McClaren Report on Russian state-sponsored doping, and excluded from the games, along with reserve Ilia Frolov. Because of this doping issue, The UIPM decided to revoke the quota place held by Kustov and thereby awarded it to Ruslan Nakoņečnijs of Latvia.

Rowing

Russia had qualified a total of six boats for each of the following rowing classes into the Olympic regatta. Four rowing crews had confirmed Olympic places for their boats in the women's lightweight double sculls and large-boat classes (men's four, men's & women's eight) at the 2015 FISA World Championships in Lac d'Aiguebelette, France, while rowers competing in the men's lightweight four and quadruple sculls were further added to the Russian roster with their top two finish at the 2016 European & Final Qualification Regatta in Lucerne, Switzerland.

A total of 32 rowers (21 men and 11 women) were named to the Olympic roster on 13 June 2016, with Athens 2004 gold medalist Sergey Fedorovtsev leading the quadruple sculls crew at his fourth straight Games. On 1 July 2016, Fedorovtsev and his men's quadruple sculls crew were disqualified from the Games for failing an off-season doping test on the former's banned substance trimetazidine, cutting the rowing team size to 28.

On 25 July 2016, the International Rowing Federation (FISA) announced the first stage of its decision on Russian eligibility, following the decision of the International Olympic Committee in relation to the nation's athletes for the Games. According to the decision issued by the IOC on the previous day, FISA declared that one registered rower, Ivan Balandin, who had been implicated in the 'disappearing positive methodology', was ineligible to compete and could not be replaced. Two more rowers, namely Anastasiia Karabelshchikova and Ivan Podshivalov, were ruled ineligible by reason of previous bans. While the qualified rowers may be moved to the affected boats, the decision placed the entry of the women's eight in doubt, as Russia will only have seven qualified rowers in the open weight category.

The following day, FISA announced the second stage of its decision on Russian eligibility. Having considered the 'international' doping record of the remaining Russian rowers, others had evidently committed doping offences; thus, FISA could not be confident that all but six rowers entered by ROC had undergone sufficient international testing. As such, FISA could only accept entries from six rowers, including one lightweight four, namely Aleksandr Chaukin, Georgy Efremenko, Artyom Kosov, Nikita Morgachyov, Vladislav Ryabtsev and Anton Zarutskiy. No other rowers were sufficiently qualified to fill any of the boats, except the men's coxless four. FISA indicated that it was seeking clarification from Russian rowing as to whether they intended to take such place in the Games. On 31 July 2016, FISA confirmed that the Russian team had accepted he invitation to field a men's coxless four, manned by four of the six cleared rowers; Anton Zarutskiy, Artyom Kosov, Vladislav Ryabtsev and Nikita Morgachyov.

Consequently, out of the original 28 rowers named to the official Olympic roster only 6 were allowed to compete in the Olympics. Forfeited quota places were provisionally awarded to Greece (men's lightweight four), Italy (men's eight and women's lightweight double sculls), and Australia (women's eight). All three nations accepted their invitations. On 3 August 2016, the Court of Arbitration for Sport rejected a final appeal by seventeen of the excluded rowers, confirming the single boat for Russia at the Games.

Qualification Legend: FA=Final A (medal); FB=Final B (non-medal); FC=Final C (non-medal); FD=Final D (non-medal); FE=Final E (non-medal); FF=Final F (non-medal); SA/B=Semifinals A/B; SC/D=Semifinals C/D; SE/F=Semifinals E/F; QF=Quarterfinals; R=Repechage

Sailing

Russian sailors have qualified one boat in each of the following classes through the 2014 ISAF Sailing World Championships, the individual fleet Worlds, and European qualifying regattas. Following the completion of the Princess Sofia Trophy Regatta, the entire Russian sailing team was announced on 2 April 2016, with former Ukrainian windsurfer Maksym Oberemko aiming to appear at his sixth Olympics under a new banner.

On 26 July 2016, World Sailing announced that 470 sailor Pavel Sozykin was deemed ineligible, as a result of his implication in the McClaren Report on Russian state-sponsored doping allegations. On 4 August 2016, Sozykin's removal was reversed and all five sailors were cleared to participate.

Hence, six named sailors were eligible to compete, pending confirmation by a CAS arbitrator in line with the procedures set out on 24 July by IOC.

Men

Women

M = Medal race; EL = Eliminated – did not advance into the medal race

Shooting

Russian shooters have achieved quota places for the following events by virtue of their best finishes at the 2014 and 2015 International Shooting Sport Federation (ISSF) World Championships, the 2015 ISSF World Cup series, and European Championships or Games, as long as they obtained a minimum qualifying score (MQS) by 31 March 2016.

On 26 July 2016, the ISSF approved the entire 18 athlete team to participate in the Olympics. On 4 August 2016, the IOC confirmed the ruling and cleared all of the shooters to participate.

Men

Women

Qualification Legend: Q = Qualify for the next round; q = Qualify for the bronze medal (shotgun)

Swimming

Russian swimmers have so far achieved qualifying standards in the following events (up to a maximum of 2 swimmers in each event at the Olympic Qualifying Time (OQT), and potentially 1 at the Olympic Selection Time (OST)): To assure their selection to the Olympic team, swimmers must finish in the top two of each individual event with the federation's corresponding standard slightly faster than the FINA A-cut at the Russian Championships & Olympic Trials ( 16 to 23 April) in Moscow.

A total of 37 swimmers (24 men and 13 women) were selected to the Russian roster for the Olympics, including London 2012 medalists Anastasia Valeryevna Zuyeva, Yuliya Yefimova, and Vladimir Morozov, and 2014 Youth Olympic backstroke champion Evgeny Rylov.

On 25 July 2016, FINA, following the guidelines set out by the International Olympic Committee, announced that seven swimmers declared by the Russian Olympic Committee for the Rio games were deemed ineligible – four, Mikhail Dovgalyuk, Yuliya Yefimova, Nataliya Lovtsova and Anastasiya Krapyvina, because of previous doping bans, and three, Nikita Lobintsev, Vladimir Morozov and Daria Ustinova, because of being implicated in the 'disappearing positive methodology' uncovered by the McClaren report. The status of relay teams involving these ineligible swimmers remained unclear. On 4 August 2016, Morozov and Lobintsev were reported to be cleared for participation by the IOC. On 5 August 2016, the date of the opening ceremony, Yuliya Yefimova, Natalya Lovtsova, Daria Ustinova, Mikhail Dovgalyuk, and Anastasiya Krapyvina were cleared for participation. Consequently, all of the declared Russian swimmers were allowed to participate.

Men

Women

Synchronized swimming

Russia has fielded a squad of nine synchronized swimmers to compete in the women's duet and team events, by winning the 2015 LEN European Champions Cup.

The synchronized swimming team, led by defending Olympic duet champions Natalia Ishchenko and Svetlana Romashina, was named on 6 July 2016. The team was cleared to compete one day prior to the opening ceremony.

Table tennis

Russia has entered three athletes into the table tennis competition at the Games. 2012 Olympian Alexander Shibaev and Polina Mikhailova secured an Olympic spot each in the men's and women's singles, respectively, by winning their respective group final match at the European Qualification Tournament in Halmstad, Sweden. Meanwhile, Maria Dolgikh granted a wildcard invitation from International Table Tennis Federation  to compete in the women's singles as one of the next seven highest-ranked eligible players, not yet qualified, on the Olympic Ranking List. In regard to the doping issue, the ITTF cleared all three athletes to compete.

Taekwondo

Russia entered three athletes into the taekwondo competition at the Olympics. 2012 Olympic bronze medalists Aleksey Denisenko and Anastasia Baryshnikova and newcomer Albert Gaun qualified automatically for their respective weight classes by finishing in the top 6 World Taekwondo Federation Olympic rankings. In regard to doping, all of the athletes were cleared to compete.

Tennis

London 2012 silver medalist Maria Sharapova was ruled ineligible to compete at the Games, as the International Tennis Federation ordered her a two-year suspension for testing positive in the banned substance meldonium.

Russia has entered eight tennis players (two men and six women) into the Olympic tournament. Andrey Kuznetsov (world no. 42) and Evgeny Donskoy (world no. 77) qualified directly for the men's singles as two of the top 56 eligible players in the ATP World Rankings, while Svetlana Kuznetsova (world no. 12), Anastasia Pavlyuchenkova (world no. 23), Daria Kasatkina (world no. 31), and Ekaterina Makarova (world no. 36) did so for the women's singles based on their WTA World Rankings as of 6 June 2016.

Having been directly entered to the singles, Kuznetsova and Makarova also opted to play with their partners Margarita Gasparyan and Elena Vesnina, respectively, in the women's doubles, by virtue of the former's top-10 WTA ranking on the list. Due to the withdrawal of several tennis players from the Games, Teymuraz Gabashvili (world no. 96) received a spare ITF Olympic place to join Donskoy and Kuznetsov in the men's singles.

On 14 July 2016, Gasparyan withdrew from the Olympics due to injury and was replaced with Kasaktina to be partnered with Kuznetsova.

On 24 July 2016, the International Tennis Federation announced that the eight players competing for Russia had been deemed eligible. On 4 August 2016, the IOC cleared all of the players to participate.

Men

Women

Triathlon

Russia has qualified a total of six triathletes for the following events at the Olympics. Two-time Olympians Alexander Bryukhankov and Dmitry Polyanski, along with Igor Polyanski, Alexandra Razarenova, Anastasia Abrosimova, and Mariya Shorets, were ranked among the top 40 eligible triathletes each in the men's and women's event, respectively, based on the International Triathlon Union's Olympic Qualification List as of 15 May 2016. In regard to doping, all of the athletes were cleared to compete.

Volleyball

Beach
Three Russian beach volleyball teams (two men's pairs and one women's pair) qualified directly for the Olympics; one by virtue of their nation's top 15 placement in the FIVB Olympic Rankings as of 13 June 2016, and two others by finishing among the top two nations each in the men's and women's tournament at the 2016 FIVB Continental Cup in Sochi. In regard to doping, all of the athletes were cleared to compete.

Indoor

Men's tournament

Russia men's volleyball team qualified for the Olympics by attaining a top finish and securing a lone outright berth at the European Olympic Qualification Tournament in Germany. In regard to doping, all of Russian volleyball athletes were cleared to compete.

Team roster

Group play

Quarterfinal

Semifinal

Bronze medal match

Women's tournament

Russia women's volleyball team qualified for the Olympics by attaining a top finish and securing a lone outright berth at the European Olympic Qualification Tournament in Turkey.

Team roster

Group play

Quarterfinal

Water polo

Summary

Women's tournament

Russia women's water polo team qualified for the Olympics by virtue of a top four finish at the Olympic Qualification Tournament in Gouda. In regard to doping, as of 7 July 2016 FINA stated that it would not disqualify the team.

Team roster

Group play

Quarterfinal

Semifinal

Bronze medal match

Wrestling

Russia has fielded a full squad of seventeen wrestlers across all weight classes (except women's freestyle 53 kg) into the Olympic competition. Majority of Olympic berths were awarded to Russian wrestlers, who finished among the top six of their respective weight classes at the 2015 World Championships, while three more secured their Olympic spots each in the men's Greco-Roman 59 & 85 kg and women's freestyle 63 kg at the 2016 European Qualification Tournament.

Two further wrestlers had claimed the remaining Olympic slots each in the women's freestyle 58 & 75 kg to complete the Russian wrestling line-up at the final meet of the World Qualification Tournament in Istanbul.

The men's freestyle wrestling team was named to the Olympic roster on 6 July 2016, with the women joining them on 19 July. The men's Greco-Roman wrestlers rounded out the squad on 22 July 2016.

On 28 July, United World Wrestling announced that four-time world medalist Viktor Lebedev was deemed ineligible to compete and had his quota place revoked in the men's freestyle 57 kg, by reason of his previous doping ban. The rest of wrestlers were cleared to compete. On 6 August, the IOC recanted their decision on the international doping ban, allowing Lebedev and others to compete in Rio.

Men's freestyle

Men's Greco-Roman

Women's freestyle

See also
Russia at the 2016 Summer Paralympics

References

External links 

 
 

Olympics
Doping in Russia
Nations at the 2016 Summer Olympics
2016